George Alfred Swartz (8 September 1928 - 1 January 2006) was a South African Anglican bishop. He was the ninth Bishop of Kimberley and Kuruman.

Education
Swartz was educated at the University of the Witwatersrand and Pembroke College, Cambridge.

Priesthood and elevation to Episcopate
Ordained in 1955, he began his career with a curacy in Cape Town and held a number of pastoral posts in the area before becoming a suffragan bishop of the diocese in 1972.

Bishop of Kimberley and Kuruman
Eleven years later he was translated to Kimberley and Kuruman, in 1983, where he remained until retirement, in 1991.

Link with the Diocese of Atlanta
Bishop Swartz originated a link between Kimberley and Kuruman and the Diocese of Atlanta in the United States of America, and on 5 June 1984 he was awarded Freedom of the City of Compton.

Death
He died in retirement in Cape Town on New Year's Eve 2006.

Notes

1928 births
2006 deaths
20th-century Anglican Church of Southern Africa bishops
University of the Witwatersrand alumni
Anglican bishops of Kimberley and Kuruman